Coccothrinax argentea is a palm which is endemic to Hispaniola.  

This species is frequently confused with Coccothrinax argentata.

Description
It is a medium-sized palm (growing about 10 m tall.  Leaves are dark green above and silvery below.  Like other Coccothrinax species, C. argentea is a fan palm.  Very young leaves are eaten as a vegetable.

Uses
It is also used medicinally by traditional healers to treat uterine fibroids and hot flashes.

Name
Common names include: Hispaniola silver thatch palm, Cana, Guano, Latanye marron, Latanye savanne, Broom palm, Hispaniolan silver palm, Silver thatch palm, Palmera plateada de La Hispaniola, Guanito, Guano de escoba.

References

argentea
Trees of Haiti
Trees of the Dominican Republic 
Plants described in 1830
Taxa named by Odoardo Beccari